Vodyansky is a rural locality (a khutor) in Zalivskoye Rural Settlement, Oktyabrsky District, Volgograd Oblast, Russia. The population was 248 as of 2010. There are 7 streets.

Geography 
Vodyansky is located in steppe, on Yergeni, on the left bank of the Aksay Yesaulovsky River, 20 km west of Oktyabrsky (the district's administrative centre) by road. Zalivsky is the nearest rural locality.

References 

Rural localities in Oktyabrsky District, Volgograd Oblast